Viscount Montgomery of Alamein, of Hindhead in the County of Surrey, is a title in the Peerage of the United Kingdom.

History
The viscountcy was created in 1946 for the military commander Field Marshal Sir Bernard Montgomery, commemorating his crucial victory in the Second Battle of El Alamein (23 October–3 November 1942) (named after a minor railway halt marking the allied defence line), which sealed the fate of Rommel's famed Afrika Korps.

As of 2022, the title is held by his grandson, Henry Montgomery, 3rd Viscount Montgomery of Alamein, who succeeded in 2020. There are currently no heirs to the viscountcy as the 3rd Viscount has no sons and there are no other living male line descendants of the 1st Viscount. If the 3rd Viscount dies without male issue, the title will become extinct.

Viscounts Montgomery (1946)
Bernard Law Montgomery, 1st Viscount Montgomery of Alamein (1887–1976)
David Bernard Montgomery, 2nd Viscount Montgomery of Alamein (1928–2020)
Henry David Montgomery, 3rd Viscount Montgomery of Alamein (b. 1954)

Genealogy
 Sir Robert Montgomery, GCSI, KCB (1809–1887) ∞ Frances Thomason († 1842),  sister of James Thomason, and had several children, including: 
 Henry Montgomery, KCMG (1847–1932), Bishop of Tasmania ∞ Maud Farrar, daughter of Frederic William Farrar, and had nine children, including: 
 Bernard Law Montgomery, 1st Viscount Montgomery of Alamein,   (1887–1976), Field Marshal ∞ 1927 Elizabeth Carver ( Hobart), sister of Major General Sir Percy Hobart,  (1885–1957) and widow of Oswald Carver, and had a son:
 David Montgomery, 2nd Viscount Montgomery of Alamein (1928–2020)

Gallery of title holders

Arms

Notes

References 
Kidd, Charles, Williamson, David (editors). Debrett's Peerage and Baronetage (1990 edition). New York: St Martin's Press, 1990, 
(Broken link)

External links
 Image of the 1st Viscount's stall plate as Knight Grand Cross of the Order of the Bath in Westminster Abbey

Viscountcies in the Peerage of the United Kingdom
Noble titles created in 1946
Clan Montgomery